"Lean on Me" is a song written and recorded by American singer-songwriter Bill Withers. It was released in April 1972 as the first single from his second album, Still Bill. It was a number one single on both the soul and Billboard Hot 100 charts, the latter chart for three weeks in July 1972. Billboard ranked it as the No. 7 song of 1972. It was ranked number 208 on Rolling Stones list of "The 500 Greatest Songs of All Time" in 2010. Numerous other versions have been recorded, and it is one of only nine songs to have reached No. 1 on the Billboard Hot 100 with versions recorded by two different artists.

Background and writing
Bill Withers' childhood in the coal mining town of Slab Fork, West Virginia, was the inspiration for "Lean on Me", which he wrote after he had moved to Los Angeles and found himself missing the strong community ethic of his hometown. He had lived in a decrepit house in the poor section of his town.

Withers recalled to SongFacts the original inspiration for the song: "I bought a little piano and I was sitting there just running my fingers up and down the piano. In the course of doing the music, that phrase crossed my mind, so then you go back and say, 'OK, I like the way that phrase, Lean On Me, sounds with this song.'" 

Withers stated in the same interview that he made an effort to keep the lyrics simple.

Several members of the Watts 103rd Street Rhythm Band were used for the recording session in 1972. A string section was also included as well.

Personnel
 Bill Withers – Piano, Vocals
 Benorce Blackmon – Guitar
 Raymond Jackson – Wurlitzer electric piano, string arrangement
 Melvin Dunlap – Bass
 James Gadson – Drums

Track listings
7-inch single
 "Lean on Me" – 3:45
 "Better Off Dead" – 2:13

Charts

Weekly charts

Year-end charts

Certifications

Club Nouveau version 

The R&B group Club Nouveau covered the song with go-go beat and took it to number one for two weeks on the Billboard Hot 100 charts in March 1987. It also reached number one on the dance charts, and number two on the Black Singles charts, kept out of the top spot by Jody Watley's "Looking for a New Love". It won a Grammy award in 1987 for Bill Withers, as the writer, for Best R&B Song.

The song ranked at number 94 in VH1's 100 Greatest One-hit Wonders of the 80s.

Track listings 
7-inch single

 "Lean on Me" – 3:58
 "Pump It Up (Lean on Me)" (reprise) – 2:38

12-inch single

 "Lean on Me" (remix)" – 7:42
 "Lean on Me" (LP version) – 5:56
 "Pump It Up (Lean on Me)" (remix) – 4:51
 "Pump It Up (Lean on Me)" (reprise – LP version) – 2:38

Charts

Weekly charts

Year-end charts

Certifications

2-4 Family version 

In 1999, 2-4 Family released "Lean on Me (With the Family)", a remake with a hip hop arrangement and additional lyrics. Epic Records published a 12-inch single and a CD maxi single in Germany.

In 2008, several years after the dissolution of 2-4 Family, founding band-member Mike Johnson performed the song with backing vocalists and dancers at the Eurovision Song Contest in Bulgaria.

Track listings

12-inch single
 "Lean on Me (With the Family)" (Special radio version) – 3:58
 "Lean on Me (With the Family)" (DSP mix) – 4:04
 "9 Lives" (Album Version) – 4:06
 "Stay" (Special Radio Version) – 4:12
 "Lean on Me (With the Family)" (Lounge mix) – 6:38
 "Stay" (Jay's D-Style Mix) – 4:15

CD maxi single
 "Lean on Me (With the Family)" (Radio version) – 3:38
 "Lean on Me (With the Family)" (DSP mix) – 4:04
 "Lean on Me (With the Family)" (Lounge mix) – 6:38
 "Lean on Me (With the Family)" (Special radio version) – 3:58
 "Stay" (Jay's D-Style mix) – 4:15
 "9 Lives" (Album version) – 4:06

Charts

Year-end charts

In popular culture
 The song is used in the ending scene of the Season 7 episode of The Simpsons titled "Radioactive Man".
 Mary J. Blige performed this song at the HBO We Are One: The Obama Inaugural Celebration at the Lincoln Memorial (January 18, 2009). The next day, a crowd spontaneously began singing the song in the Purple Tunnel of Doom under the National Mall as they waited to gain entrance to the inauguration ceremonies.
 On October 3, 2015, Hillary Clinton, during her presidential campaign, made a cameo appearance on Saturday Night Live in a comedy sketch alongside Kate McKinnon, who regularly parodied Clinton for the show. At the end of the sketch, the duo sang "Lean on Me" together.
 In the animated series Amphibia, the song plays at the climax of the first-season finale "Reunion".

Notable cover versions 
 In 1989, remakes of "Lean on Me" by the Winans and Sandra Reaves-Phillips provided the emotional uplift for the film Lean on Me. For the same film, the song was adapted by Big Daddy Kane in "hip hop" form. That same year Kids Incorporated covered "Lean on Me" in the Season 6 episode "The Cover Up".
 In 2020, the song was recorded by an ad hoc supergroup of Canadian musicians credited as ArtistsCAN, both in tribute to Withers' recent death and to raise funds for the Canadian Red Cross during the COVID-19 pandemic. Participating artists included Bryan Adams, Jann Arden, Justin Bieber, Michael Bublé, Fefe Dobson, Scott Helman, Shawn Hook, Avril Lavigne, Geddy Lee, Marie-Mai, Sarah McLachlan, Johnny Orlando, Josh Ramsay, Buffy Sainte-Marie, Tyler Shaw, Walk Off the Earth, Donovan Woods, and Olivia Lunny.

References

External links
 

1972 singles
1987 singles
1999 singles
2010 singles
Bill Withers songs
Grammy Hall of Fame Award recipients
Charity singles
Billboard Hot 100 number-one singles
Cashbox number-one singles
Number-one singles in New Zealand
RPM Top Singles number-one singles
Songs written by Bill Withers
Pop ballads
Soul ballads
1970s ballads
Songs about friendship
1972 songs
Sussex Records singles
Warner Records singles
Epic Records singles